Jennifer Anne MacKinnon "Jenni" Sidey-Gibbons (born August 3, 1988) is a Canadian astronaut, engineer, and academic. She was selected by the Canadian Space Agency (CSA) as one of the two members of the 2017 CSA Group alongside Joshua Kutryk.

Early life and education
Sidey was born on August 3, 1988 in  Calgary, Alberta. Sidey graduated from McGill University with a Bachelor of Engineering with honours degree in mechanical engineering. While she was at McGill, she carried out research in collaboration with the Canadian Space Agency (CSA) and the National Research Council Flight Research Laboratory on flame propagation in microgravity. 

She subsequently went on to complete a PhD in engineering at Jesus College, Cambridge in 2015, where she focused on combustion under the supervision of Professor Nondas Mastorakos.

Academic career
Prior to joining the Canadian Space Agency (CSA), Sidey was a lecturer in internal combustion engines at the Department of Engineering of the University of Cambridge. The focus of her research was turbulent flame physics and pollutant reduction in combustion systems. She also taught undergraduate and graduate students in the Energy, Fluid Mechanics and Turbomachinery Division on topics ranging from conventional and alternative energy production to introductory thermodynamics and flame physics. In 2016, she was awarded the Institution of Engineering and Technology's Young Woman Engineer of the Year Award, as well as a Royal Academy of Engineering Young Engineer of the Year Award.

CSA career
Sidey was selected by the Canadian Space Agency (CSA) to undergo training as an astronaut as part of the 2017 CSA Group, the fourth Canadian astronaut recruitment campaign. Sidey and Joshua Kutryk were selected among a large field of qualified candidates.

In July 2017, Sidey relocated to Houston, Texas, to complete the two-year NASA Astronaut Candidate Training Program at the Johnson Space Center. She is training alongside the 2017 NASA astronaut class.

References

External links

CSA profile

CSA Video Gallery
CSA Photo Gallery

1988 births
Living people
Alumni of Jesus College, Cambridge
Canadian astronauts
Canadian women engineers
Fellows of St Catharine's College, Cambridge
McGill University Faculty of Engineering alumni
People from Calgary
Women astronauts
21st-century Canadian engineers